Year 1224 (MCCXXIV) was a leap year starting on Monday (link will display the full calendar) of the Julian calendar.

Events 
 By place 

 Byzantine Empire 
 Spring – Battle of Poimanenon: Byzantine forces under Emperor John III (Doukas Vatatzes), ruler of Nicaea, defeat the Latin army under the brothers Alexios Laskaris and Isaac Laskaris. They begin a revolt and decide to aid the request of Emperor Robert I of Courtenay. The two armies meet at Poimanenon, south of Cyzicus in Mysia, near Lake Kuş (Bird Lake). In the ensuing battle, John III achieves a decisive victory; among the captives taken are the two Laskaris brothers, who are blinded. The victory opens the way for the recovery by the Byzantines of most of the Latin possessions in Asia Minor.
 December – Theodore Komnenos (Doukas), ruler of the Despotate of Epirus, captures Thessaloniki – beginning the de facto Byzantine Empire of Thessalonica. Later, Theodore Komnenos has crowned Byzantine emperor but is not recognized as such by the rest of the Greek or Latin population.

 Europe 
 February – King Ferdinand III (the Saint) announces his intention to resume the Reconquista against the realm of the Almohad Caliphate. Caliph Yusuf II al-Mustansir dies and is succeeded by Abu Muhammad al-Wahid, but in Al-Andalus, two competing pretenders also claim their rights to the throne: Abu Muhammad Ibn al-Mansur al-Adil in Seville and Abu Muhammad abu Abdallah al-Bayyasi in Córdoba. The chronic political instability on the Almohad site allows Ferdinand to begin his campaign victoriously in October, with the capture of Quesada in Spain.
 May 5 – King Louis VIII (the Lion) declares war on King Henry III of England. He allies himself with Hugh X of Lusignan and invades first Poitou and then Northern Gascony. The English forces in Poitou are under-strength and lack support from the Poitevin nobles; as a result, the province quickly falls into French hands by the end of June.
 September – Abdallah al-Adil (the Just), governor in Al-Andalus, challenges the Almohad throne and captures Seville. He marches to Marrakesh to confront Abu Muhammad al-Wahid. Abdallah seizes the royal palace and deposes Muhammad al-Wahid, who is murdered by strangulation.
 Livonian Crusade: The Livonian Brothers of the Sword defeat the Estonians and reconquer the captured strongholds on the Estonian mainland. With the surrender of the Tartu stronghold, only the islands of Saaremaa and Muhu remain under Estonian control.

 England 
 Spring – Falkes de Bréauté, English high sheriff and a rival of Henry III, refuses to relinquish his castles and starts a rebellion. Cardinal Stephen Langton and forces under Hubert de Burgh deal with Falkes and the castles are handed over. Falkes is found guilty of 16 counts of Wrongful Disseisin, he and his brother William are excommunicated by Langton.
 June–August –The garrison at Bedford Castle, belonging to Falkes de Bréauté, refuses to surrender to Henry III. The castle falls when the keep is undermined, the garrison, who has surrendered the castle, are all hanged by order of the king. Falkes is allowed to leave the country but loses all his possessions. Bedford Castle is badly damaged as a result.

 Asia 
 Spring – The Mongol army led by Subutai and Jochi cross the steppes of modern Kazakhstan, and returns to the horde of Genghis Khan on the Irtysh River. At a great kurultai or gathering of chiefs, Subutai reports on the Western campaign. Jochi submits to Genghis and his supposed 'insubordination' (see 1220) is forgiven. As a result of the Mongol invasion in 1219–1223, Kazakhstan and Central Asia become part of the Mongol Empire.
 January 14 – Emperor Xuan Zong of the Chinese Jurchen-led Jin Dynasty dies after a 10-year reign. He is succeeded by his 25-year-old son, Ai Zong, who conquers more Song territory during the Jin–Song Wars. 
 September 17 – Emperor Ning Zong of the Chinese Song Dynasty dies (possibly poisoned) after a 30-year reign, at Hangzhou. He is succeeded by his relative, Li Zong, as all of Ning Zong's children have died. 

 By topic 

 Education 
 June 5 – The University of Naples is founded by Emperor Frederick II. Frederick's main purpose is to create an institution of higher learning that will put an end to the predominance of the universities of northern Italy, most notably these of Bologna and Padua, which are considered either too independent or under the strong influence of Pope Honorius III.

 Religion 
 September 14 – Francis of Assisi, while praying on the mountain of La Verna during a 40-day fast, has a vision, as a result of which he receives the stigmata. Brother Leo, who is with Francis at the time, leaves a clear and simple account of this event, the first definite account of the phenomenon of stigmata.

Births 
 March 5 – Kinga of Poland, high duchess of Poland (d. 1292)
 March 20 – Sophie of Thuringia, duchess of Brabant (d. 1275)
 June 14 – Matlda of Brabant, countess of Artois (d. 1288)
 Alice de Lusignan, countess of Surrey (d. 1256)
 Elena of Bulgaria, empress of Nicaea (d. 1258)
 Herman I, German nobleman and knight (d. 1290)
 Hōjō Tsunetoki, Japanese regent (shikken) (d. 1246)
 Isabelle of France, French princess and nun (d. 1270)
 Jean de Joinville, French historian and writer (d. 1317)
 Kanezawa Sanetoki, Japanese nobleman (d. 1276)
 Margery de Burgh, Norman noblewoman (d. 1252)
 Maud de Braose, English noblewoman (d. 1301)
 Pribislaw I, German nobleman and knight (d. 1275)
 Teruko, Japanese princess and empress (d. 1262)
 Theobald Butler, Norman chief governor (d. 1248)
 William II, French nobleman and knight (d. 1251)

Deaths 
 January 14 – Xuan Zong, Chinese emperor (b. 1163)
 March 24 – Conrad III, German cleric and bishop (b. 1165)
 March 27 – William of Sainte-Mère-Église, Norman bishop
 April 14 – Matilda of Dendermonde, Flemish noblewoman
 April 30 – Bernard II, German nobleman and knight (b. 1140) 
 July 1 – Hōjō Yoshitoki, Japanese regent (shikken) (b. 1163)
 July 24 – Christina the Astonishing, Flemish saint (b. 1150)
 August 15 – Marie of France, duchess of Brabant (b. 1198)
 September 17 – Ning Zong, Chinese emperor (b. 1168)
 Abu Muhammad al-Wahid, ruler of the Almohad Caliphate
 Cathal Crobdearg Ua Conchobair, king of Connacht (b. 1153)
 Durand of Huesca, Spanish monk and theologian (b. 1160)
 Judah ben Isaac Messer, French Jewish rabbi (b. 1166)
 Liu Songnian, Chinese landscape painter (b. 1174)
 Máel Muire Ó Connaig, Irish bishop of Kilmacduagh
 Raoul of Mérencourt, Latin patriarch of Jerusalem
 Simon Rochfort (or de Rupeforti), English bishop
 Thomas I, Hungarian chancellor and archbishop
 William d'Aubigny, English nobleman and knight
 William de Mowbray, English nobleman and knight 
 Xia Gui (or Hsia Kui), Chinese landscape painter 
 Yusuf II al-Mustansir, ruler of the Almohad Caliphate

References